Richard H. LeSesne was an American photographer, noted for his photography of land speed record attempts on Daytona Beach, Florida, in the 1920s and 1930s. More than merely a recorder of other peoples' efforts, LeSesne achieved some celebrity himself as the photographer of these attempts and his signature may be found on photographs of the period along with those of other team members and even the driver himself.

He was active from at least 1897 to 1935.

Many of his photographs are now held in the Florida Photographic Collection.

References

External links 

 

American photographers
Year of birth missing
Year of death missing
Artists from Florida
Land speed record people